Fish Creek Island is a 48-acre (19-hectare) island on the Ohio River in Marshall County, West Virginia, United States. The island is located across the river from Captina, West Virginia, south of Moundsville, and north of the mouth of Fish Creek, from which it takes its name.

Previously owned by CONSOL Energy Inc., Fish Creek Island was donated by CONSOL to the Nature Conservancy to protect the island's habitat for its rare great blue herons. The bar is West Virginia's largest great blue heron rookery. The Nature Conservancy turned over Fish Creek Island to the Ohio River Islands National Wildlife Refuge which is now a protected island of the reserve.

See also 
List of islands of West Virginia

References

External links
Fish Creek Island on WikiMapia

River islands of West Virginia
Protected areas of Marshall County, West Virginia
Islands of the Ohio River
Landforms of Marshall County, West Virginia